Monkey pod is a common name for several plants and may refer to:

 Samanea saman, used in woodworking
 Lecythis ollaria
 Pithecellobium dulce
 Senna petersiana